Johannes Franciscus Verstappen (born 4 March 1972) is a Dutch former racing driver who competed in Formula One for Benetton, Simtek, Footwork Arrows, Tyrrell, Stewart, and Minardi. Verstappen was the German Formula Three champion and Masters of Formula Three winner in 1993.  

In Formula 1, Verstappen raced for seven different teams during eight seasons. From 1994 through 2003, he scored two podium finishes in his career, the first Dutch F1 racer to do so.

Since leaving F1, Verstappen won races in A1 Grand Prix and Le Mans Series LMP2 races, winning the 24 hours of Le Mans' 2008 LMP2 class. 

Verstappen has coached his son Max from an early age in karting, through to Max's successes as an F1 driver becoming the 2021 and 2022 Formula One Drivers Champion. Jos has also served as a manager for Max.

Early career
Verstappen began karting at the age of 8, and was participating in national competitions not long after. In 1984 he became Dutch junior champion. He remained successful, and won two European titles.

At the end of 1991 he made the transition to car racing. He drove in Formula Opel Lotus, a class in which identical cars compete against each other. He won the European championship in his first year, and got an offer to drive in Formula Three with Van Amersfoort Racing, who also developed other drivers such as Christijan Albers, Tom Coronel and Bas Leinders. During that European winter season, he raced in New Zealand Formula Atlantic. Subsequently, in German Formula Three, he won several international competitions, including the 1993 Marlboro Masters and the German Formula 3 championship.

Formula One

1994: Benetton
Verstappen first drove a Formula One car when he tested for the Footwork Arrows team alongside Gil de Ferran and Christian Fittipaldi at the Estoril circuit in Portugal. The test took place on September 28, 1993, two days after the Portuguese Grand Prix was held at the same circuit.  Despite the large increase in power (from a 175 bhp Formula Three car to the 750 bhp of Formula One), Verstappen set a time that would have qualified him in the preceding race on his fourth timed lap, and improved his time by more than a second after 65 laps.  His best lap time of the day was 1:14.45, which was only 0.07 seconds slower than regular driver Derek Warwick had lapped during qualifying, and would have placed him tenth on the grid. He tested again on September 30 and was lapping near his existing record after five laps, but then crashed the car, ending the test early.

After the test, Verstappen was contacted by every Formula One team except Ferrari and Williams, and was eventually signed as the Benetton team's test driver for the 1994 season.

After a crash in pre-season testing by regular driver JJ Lehto (who broke a vertebra), Verstappen drove in the first two races of the season as a substitute, partnering Michael Schumacher and made his Formula One debut at the 1994 Brazilian Grand Prix. During the race he collided with Eddie Irvine, which triggered a multiple accident also involving Éric Bernard and Martin Brundle. Verstappen's car somersaulted, but he emerged unharmed. At the Pacific Grand Prix Verstappen ran 6th but spun off on cold tyres immediately after a pit stop. Lehto was fit for the next race at Imola, but his performances in subsequent races were disappointing and he was rested by Benetton following the Canadian Grand Prix, allowing Verstappen to return to the race seat.

One of the most dramatic incidents affected Verstappen at the German Grand Prix. During his first scheduled pitstop during the race, fuel leaked onto the car after the fuel hose was disconnected. The car, with Verstappen in it, was engulfed in flames for several seconds. As was usual at the time, Verstappen had slightly opened the visor of his helmet for the pit stop, but apart from slight burns to his nose, he was uninjured. After this incident the fuel delivery hose was modified to incorporate a fail-safe cut-out system.

A high point in this season was Verstappen's third place during the next Grand Prix in Hungary, Schumacher having allowed Verstappen to unlap himself on the final lap to pass Martin Brundle's stricken McLaren-Peugeot. He took another third place at the Belgian Grand Prix due to Schumacher's post-race disqualification from victory, and a fifth place at the Portuguese Grand Prix. A curiosity was his accident during a practice session for the French Grand Prix at Magny-Cours, in which Verstappen rammed his car into the pit wall causing debris to fly up and destroy a TV installation. Due to this accident, this equipment is now protected from the race track by acrylic glass.

For the last two races of the season, Verstappen was replaced by the more experienced Johnny Herbert in a bid to win the Constructors' Championship for Benetton. Although the team was unsuccessful in this aim, losing out to the rival Williams team, Herbert was signed for the 1995 season instead of Verstappen.

1995: Simtek
In  he was loaned to Simtek by Benetton team principal Flavio Briatore. Despite some strong showings (including running 6th at the Argentine Grand Prix before a poor pit stop and subsequent gearbox failure) Verstappen only finished once in the five races he drove for the team due to technical difficulties. The team had deep financial troubles and went bankrupt after the Monaco Grand Prix. Out of a race drive, Verstappen did some test driving with Benetton and Ligier (then part-owned by Briatore and Tom Walkinshaw). Briatore decided against taking up his option for Verstappen in 1996, signing Jean Alesi and Gerhard Berger to drive instead.

1996: Footwork Arrows
In  he drove for the Footwork team. He ran fifth at Interlagos before retiring, and finished sixth in Buenos Aires. Shortly after, the team was taken over by Walkinshaw's TWR organisation. During the  Belgian Grand Prix a part of the suspension of Verstappen's car broke off, causing him to crash heavily. He ended up with a prolonged neck injury. Initially Verstappen featured strongly in Walkinshaw's plans for 1997 (the new owner at one point threatening to replace him with a pay driver unless he signed for another season)  but the surprise availability of Damon Hill (soon to be crowned World Champion) saw him dropped instead. His form in the second half of the season dropped off as development on the 1996 car ground to a standstill, TWR Arrows focusing instead on 1997.

1997: Tyrrell
In  he went to the Tyrrell team but did not score any points, though he briefly ran fifth in the Canadian Grand Prix. The team suffered from an underpowered Ford Cosworth EDV V8 engine and a lack of funding leaving Verstappen and teammate Mika Salo struggling towards the rear of the field. Verstappen's best result for the team was eighth at the wet Monaco Grand Prix. Before the 1998 season Tyrrell were sold to British American Tobacco, who intended to rebrand the team as British American Racing in 1999 after one final season under the Tyrrell banner. Ken Tyrrell wanted to retain Verstappen alongside Toranosuke Takagi but BAR insisted on taking pay driver Ricardo Rosset alongside the young Japanese driver. Tyrrell himself left the team in disgust over the matter, leaving Dr. Harvey Postlethwaite to run the team.

1998: Stewart

Out of a regular drive for 1998, Verstappen tested for Benetton once again early in the year, but the team would not hire him as a permanent test driver for lack of sponsors. As an experienced, fast free agent Verstappen was a common name mentioned in pit lane gossip as a replacement for underperforming drivers. He would eventually return to the series at the French Grand Prix, replacing Jan Magnussen at Stewart. However, the car was uncompetitive, the team struggled to run two cars to the same level and Verstappen did not perform significantly better than his predecessor. Johnny Herbert was signed to partner Rubens Barrichello for 1999 and Verstappen was left casting around for a drive again.

1999: Honda

However, for once it looked like things were going in the right direction for Verstappen. Near the end of 1998 he became the test driver for the Honda Formula One project. He teamed up with old Tyrrell friends Rupert Manwaring and Harvey Postlethwaite, planning to test the new car in 1999 and join the series in 2000. All went well for the operation, with the testing hack showing well against upper-midfield teams such as Benetton and Williams in various test sessions until Postlethwaite died of a heart attack. Not long after, Honda changed their plans from becoming a team to a works engine supplier and Verstappen was again without a Formula One seat. He tested for the Jordan team in case Damon Hill decided to retire before the end of the season but this came to nothing when Verstappen's testing performance was underwhelming and Hill resolved to see out the season.

2000–2001: Return to Arrows

In  he returned to Arrows, who had put together a package including Supertec engines, a chassis with good straight-line speed and a bevy of sponsors. The car proved to be unreliable, but its speed allowed Verstappen and teammate Pedro de la Rosa to dice with the front runners at several circuits. The design's small fuel tank meant the cars were often lighter than their rivals. In his second race back at Interlagos he ran 6th before spinning due to a sore neck brought on by his lack of recent seat time. In the wet/dry Canadian Grand Prix, he drove superbly in the later stages to move into 5th position and score his first points since 1996. After the first corner accidents in Austria de la Rosa and Verstappen ran 4th and 5th but mechanical problems sidelined them both. Verstappen would score only once again, a strong 4th place at Monza.

For 2001 he was retained by Arrows. The Supertec engines were replaced by Asiatech units and de la Rosa was dropped on the eve of the season in favour of the Red Bull-backed Enrique Bernoldi. The package was more reliable but less competitive and Verstappen was hurt on occasion by indifferent qualifying form (often lining up behind his rookie teammate on the grid). Highlights of the season included running 2nd at Sepang having started 18th, making a superb start and running well in changing conditions before dropping to 7th and later scoring the team's only point of the year for 6th at the A1-Ring. At Interlagos, he ran into the back of leader Juan Pablo Montoya just after being lapped while at Montreal, he moved into the top six but retired with brake failure.

He re-signed to drive for Arrows in 2002, but was dropped at the eleventh hour in favour of Heinz-Harald Frentzen. Later that year he almost signed a test contract with Sauber but he turned out to be physically too large for the car, which was smaller than its predecessor.

2003: Minardi

He returned to the cockpit in 2003 with Paul Stoddart's European Minardi team, considered the tail enders of the grid. With limited funds and underpowered engines it was a difficult season with little opportunity to shine. His best result was 9th at the Canadian Grand Prix, one place away from a point under the new scoring system. At the Brazilian Grand Prix, he had been running ahead of eventual winner Giancarlo Fisichella on the same strategy only to spin off on standing water, but generally the year was one to forget – and many noted that Verstappen was largely outperformed by rookie teammate Justin Wilson. At the end of the year he left the Italian team because he did not feel like driving in the rear-guard for another year.

Out of a drive for 2004 Verstappen was considered as a replacement for Giorgio Pantano at Jordan partway through the season but was unable to fit in the car and began looking for drives outside Formula One for the following season.

Verstappen participated in 107 Grands Prix. He achieved two podium places, and scored a total of 17 championship points (117 in the modern system) which makes him the second best performing Dutch driver in Formula One to date, beaten only by his son, Max. Jos Verstappen's highest qualifying position was 6th, at the 1994 Belgian Grand Prix.

A1 Grand Prix 

After two years of not participating in races, Verstappen was confirmed in July as driver of the A1 Team Netherlands managed by seatholder Jan Lammers's Racing for Holland, for the A1 Grand Prix series. They won the feature race at Durban.

On 27 September 2006, Verstappen split with A1 Team Netherlands after failing to secure payment guarantees. This resulted from Verstappen only being paid for the 2005/06 season a few weeks before the next season started. He was replaced by Jeroen Bleekemolen for the first race of the 2006/07 season at the team's home race at Zandvoort.

Le Mans Series 

In December 2007, Verstappen announced that he would take part in the 2008 24 Hours of Le Mans race, as well as enter the 1,000 kilometre races in the Le Mans Series. Driving a LMP2-class Porsche RS Spyder fielded by Van Merksteijn Motorsport, Verstappen was partnered by team owner Peter van Merksteijn Sr. Jeroen Bleekemolen also joined the team for the 24 Hours of Le Mans race.

After winning the 1000km Catalunya and 1000km Spa, and finishing second in the 1000km Monza, Jos Verstappen won the LMP2 class of the 2008 24 Hours of Le Mans. With his victory at the 1000km Nurburgring, Verstappen clinched the LMP2 Drivers' title and Van Merksteijn Motorsport won the LMP2 Manufacturers' title.

Verstappen participated in the 2009 24 Hours of Le Mans in a Lola-Aston Martin.

Personal life

In 1996, Verstappen married Belgian ex-kart driver champion Sophie Kumpen, whose cousin is NASCAR Whelen Euro Series racing driver Anthony Kumpen, and whose uncle is former motocross and GT endurance rally driver Paul Kumpen. Verstappen and Sophie have two children, Max (b. 1997) and Victoria (b. 1999). He has a second daughter, Blue Jaye (b. 2014), with his second wife Kelly van der Waal.  He also has a second son,  Jason Jaxx (b. 2019) and third daughter Mila Faye (b. 2020), with his third wife Sandy Sijtsma.  Both Max and Victoria have gone on to become racing drivers, with Max becoming a two-time Formula One World Drivers Champion. In 2021 and 2022.

Verstappen speaks Dutch, English and German.

Controversy
After a 1998 incident at a karting track in which a man suffered a fractured skull, Verstappen and his father, Frans, were found guilty in court of assault but were each given a five-year suspended jail sentence after reaching an out-of-court settlement with the victim.

In December 2008, with the couple effectively separated, Verstappen appeared in court in Tongeren, Belgium, charged with assaulting his wife, Sophie Kumpen. He was found not guilty of assault, but guilty of threatening Kumpen in text messages and of violating a previously issued restraining order. He was fined and sentenced to three months probational, suspended prison sentence.

On 29 November 2011, the media reported allegations that Verstappen had assaulted his ex-girlfriend; Verstappen claimed to only have had a discussion with her. In January 2012, he was arrested on attempted murder charges following accusations that he drove a car into his ex-girlfriend in Roermond, but released two weeks later after the charge was withdrawn. Verstappen and his ex-girlfriend, Kelly van der Waal, got back together and were married in 2014. They have one daughter, Blue Jaye, born in September 2014. They divorced on 2 June 2017.

Racing record

Career summary

† Verstappen was the test driver for the aborted Honda F1 project.

Complete German Formula Three results
(key) (Races in bold indicate pole position) (Races in italics indicate fastest lap)

Complete Formula One results 
(key) (Races in bold indicate pole position) (Races in italics indicate fastest lap)

† Did not finish, but was classified as he had completed more than 90% of the race distance.

Complete A1 Grand Prix results 
(Races in bold indicate pole position) (Races in italics indicate fastest lap)

24 Hours of Le Mans results

References

External links

Verstappen family official site

1972 births
Living people
Dutch racing drivers
People from Roerdalen
Dutch Formula One drivers
Benetton Formula One drivers
Simtek Formula One drivers
Arrows Formula One drivers
Tyrrell Formula One drivers
Stewart Formula One drivers
Minardi Formula One drivers
A1 Team Netherlands drivers
German Formula Three Championship drivers
24 Hours of Le Mans drivers
European Le Mans Series drivers
Karting World Championship drivers
EFDA Nations Cup drivers
Sportspeople from Limburg (Netherlands)
A1 Grand Prix drivers
Aston Martin Racing drivers
Van Amersfoort Racing drivers
Dutch expatriate sportspeople in Monaco